Eclipse is a live album by Brazilian psychedelic rock band Violeta de Outono, released in 1995 by Argentine independent label Record Runner. It was recorded during the band's performance at the SESC Pompeia in São Paulo, in 1986.

Track listing

Personnel
 Fabio Golfetti – vocals, guitar
 Cláudio Souza – drums
 Angelo Pastorello – bass

References

External links
 Eclipse at Discogs

1995 live albums
Violeta de Outono albums
Portuguese-language albums